Zhang Zhongxian (January 1926 – 5 March 2022) was a Chinese lieutenant general (zhongjiang) of the People's Liberation Army (PLA) who served as political commissar of Guangzhou Military Region between 1985 and 1992. He was a representative of the 13th and 14th National Congress of the Chinese Communist Party. He was an alternate member of the 12th Central Committee of the Chinese Communist Party and a member of the 16th and 13th Central Committee of the Chinese Communist Party. He was a member of the Standing Committee of the 8th National People's Congress.

Biography
Zhang was born Zhang Zemin in Lincheng County (now Weishan County), Shandong, in January 1926. He enlisted in the Eighth Route Army in 1940 and joined the Chinese Communist Party in the following year. 

During the Second Sino-Japanese War, he fought with the Imperial Japanese Army in southern Shandong. During the Chinese Civil War, he took part in the Liaoshen campaign. After the founding of the Communist State, he was present at the Battle of Hainan Island and soon participated in the Korean War. In June 1985, he was promoted to become political commissar of Guangzhou Military Region, a position he held until October 1992. He was promoted to the rank of lieutenant general (zhongjiang) in 1988.  

Zhang died in Guangzhou, Guangdong on 5 March 2022, at the age of 96.

References

1926 births
2022 deaths
People from Weishan County, Shandong
People's Liberation Army generals from Shandong
People's Republic of China politicians from Shandong
Chinese Communist Party politicians from Shandong
Alternate members of the 12th Central Committee of the Chinese Communist Party
Members of the 13th Central Committee of the Chinese Communist Party
Members of the Standing Committee of the 8th National People's Congress
Political commissars of the Guangzhou Military Region